

Matches
Scores and results list England's points tally first.

Touring party

Manager: Clive Woodward
Assistant Manager: Andy Robinson
Captain: Martin Johnson

Full back
Matt Perry (Bath Rugby), Tim Stimpson (Leicester Tigers), Rob Thirlby (Bath Rugby).

Three-quarters
Liam Botham (Newcastle Falcons), Mike Catt (Bath Rugby), Ben Cohen (Northampton Saints), Will Greenwood (Leicester Tigers), Steve Hanley (Sale), Austin Healey (Leicester Tigers), Ben Johnston (Saracens), Josh Lewsey (London Wasps), Leon Lloyd (Leicester Tigers), Dan Luger (Saracens), Mike Tindall (Bath Rugby).

Half-backs
Scott Benton (Leeds), Kyran Bracken (Saracens), Ali Hepher (Northampton Saints), Nick Walshe (Saracens), Jonny Wilkinson (Newcastle Falcons), Martyn Wood (Saracens).

Forwards

Neil Back (Leicester Tigers), Steve Borthwick (Bath Rugby), Ben Clarke (Bath Rugby), Martin Corry (Leicester Tigers), Lawrence Dallaglio (London Wasps), David Flatman (Saracens), Darren Garforth (Leicester Tigers), Will Green (London Wasps), Phil Greening (London Wasps), Danny Grewcock (Saracens), Martin Johnson (Leicester Tigers), Richard Hill (Saracens), Jason Leonard (Harlequins), Andy Long (Bath Rugby), Mark Regan (Bath Rugby), Graham Rowntree (Leicester Tigers), Simon Shaw (London Wasps), Andrew Sheridan (Bristol), Paul Volley (London Wasps), Julian White (Saracens), Roy Winters (Bedford Blues), Trevor Woodman (Gloucester Rugby), Joe Worsley (London Wasps).

References

2000
2000 in South African rugby union
1999–2000 in English rugby union